Quercus crassifolia is a species of oak. It is widespread in Mexico from Sonora and Chihuahua to Veracruz and Chiapas. It has also been found in Guatemala.

The shoots are covered with many yellow or light brown branching hairs. People of the region use the wood to make tool handles and farm implements.

References

External links
 photo of herbarium specimen at Missouri Botanical Garden, collected in Nuevo León in 1993

crassifolia
Oaks of Mexico
Trees of Puebla
Trees of Veracruz
Flora of Guatemala
Plants described in 1809
Taxa named by Aimé Bonpland
Flora of the Sierra Madre Occidental
Flora of the Central American pine–oak forests